The Hampton Lady Pirates basketball team is the basketball team that represents Hampton University in Hampton, Virginia, United States. The school's team currently competes in the Colonial Athletic Association.

History
Hampton began play in 1975. They competed in the CIAA in their time in Division II, winning three tournament titles and four regular season titles, with three runner up finishes in the tournament final. They made the NCAA Division II Tournament in 1985, 1986, 1987, 1988, 1989, 1991, and 1994. They won the 1988 NCAA Division II women's basketball tournament, beating West Texas State 65–48. They joined Division I in 1995. Since joining Division I (and the MEAC), they have won conference tournament titles in 2000, 2003, 2004, 2010, 2011, 2012, 2013, 2014, 2017 (reaching the NCAA Tournament in those corresponding years) and regular season titles in 1999, 2003, 2004, 2011, 2012, 2013, 2014, and 2015. As of the end of the 2015-16 season, the Lady Pirates have an all-time record of 752-462.

Postseason appearances

NCAA Division I tournament
Hampton has played in the NCAA Division I women's basketball tournament nine times. They have an 0-9 record.

NCAA Division II tournament
Hampton had participated in six NCAA Division II women's basketball tournaments in their time in that classification. They went 10-5, with one title.

WNIT appearances
The Lady Pirates have played in the Women's National Invitation Tournament once. They have a record of 1-1.

References

External links